Monteverde is a comune in the province of Avellino in Southern Italy.

History

In the 11th century, Monteverde became a bishopric seat and had a bishop until 1531, when the diocese of Monteverde was merged with the diocese of Canne. From 1532 to 1641, it was a baronial seigniory, held by a branch of the Grimaldi family. The diocese was eventually cancelled in 1818.

References

Cities and towns in Campania